Jeffrey A. Bader (born 1945) was the senior director for Asian affairs on the National Security Council in the Obama Administration and a former United States Ambassador to Namibia.

Career
Bader retired from foreign service in 2002 and later joined the Brookings Institution, where he was director of John L. Thornton China Center. From 2009 to 2011, he was senior director for Asian affairs on the National Security Council under the Obama Administration.

Personal life
Bader is of Jewish descent. In 1985, he married documentary filmmaker Rohini Talalla who he met in New York City. Talalla is an immigrant from Kuala Lumpur, Malaysia and is of mixed Sri Lankan, Welsh, Burmese and Chinese ancestry.

References

External links

Sino-American Relations and US Policy Options, a statement by Jeffrey A. Bader before the House International Relations committee

1945 births
Ambassadors of the United States to Namibia
Columbia Graduate School of Arts and Sciences alumni
20th-century American Jews
Living people
United States Foreign Service personnel
21st-century American Jews
20th-century American diplomats
21st-century American diplomats
Yale College alumni